The Governor of West Flanders is the head of government for the Belgian province of West Flanders. The province is located in the Flemish Region of Belgium.

Governor (1815-1830)
Provincial governors of West Flanders under the United Kingdom of the Netherlands (1815-1830).

 1815 - 1821: Joseph Benoît de Loën d'Enschede
 1821 - 1822: Hyacinthe van der Fosse 
 1822 - 1826: Benedictus Josephus Holvoet 
 1826 - 1830: Ferdinand de Baillet

Governors of West Flanders (1830 – Present)
A list of governors since Belgian independence in 1830.

References

West Flanders